The 2000–01 UNC Greensboro Spartans men's basketball team represented the University of North Carolina at Greensboro during the 2000–01 NCAA Division I men's basketball season. The Spartans were led by second-year head coach Fran McCaffery and played its home games at Greensboro Coliseum as members of the North Division of the Southern Conference. They finished the season 19–12, 10–6 in SoCon play to finished second in the North Division. They won the Southern Conference tournament to earn the conference's automatic bid to the NCAA tournament. Playing as the No. 16 seed in the West region, the Spartans were beaten by No. 1 seed Stanford, 89–60.

Roster

Schedule and results

|-
!colspan=9 style=| Regular Season

|-
!colspan=9 style=| Southern Conference tournament

|-
!colspan=9 style=| NCAA tournament

References

UNC Greensboro
UNC Greensboro Spartans men's basketball seasons
Southern Conference men's basketball champion seasons
UNC Greensboro
2000 in sports in North Carolina
2001 in sports in North Carolina